Marc Giacardy (15 February 1881 in Bordeaux - 28 August 1917 à la Ferme-de-Mormont, near Verdun) was a French rugby union player. He was 1 m 75 tall and weighed 73 kg. He played at the position of tighthead prop, fly-half, and more rarely hooker or second row, and played for Stade Bordelais.

During the 1911/12 season Giacardy refereed the final of the French Rugby Championship between, Stade Toulousain and Racing club de France.

He was a journalist by profession.

During the First World War he was stationed with the 6th Infantry Regiment, in which he was a captain. He was killed in action at the front in 1917, at la Ferme-de-Mormont, near Verdun.

Palmarès 
Giacardy won just a single international cap in the 1907 encounter with England.  
 Champion de France 6 times, in 1899, 1904, 1905, 1906, 1907, and 1909 (Captain in the final this year).
 Vice-champion de France in 1900 (without playing the final), 1901, 1902, and 1908 (Captain in the final this year).

Captained France in the trials match against the Rest of France on 22 December 1907, ahead of the international matches in 1908.

References
 Godwin, Terry Complete Who's Who of International Rugby (Cassell, 1987)

France international rugby union players
French rugby union players
1881 births
Sportspeople from Bordeaux
1917 deaths
French rugby union referees
French military personnel killed in World War I
French male non-fiction writers
20th-century French journalists
20th-century French male writers
Stade Bordelais players
Rugby union props
Rugby union fly-halves